In footwear, a hobnail is a short nail with a thick head used to increase the durability of boot soles.

Uses

Hobnailed boots (in Scotland "tackety boots") are boots with hobnails (nails inserted into the soles of the boots), usually installed in a regular pattern, over the sole. They usually have an iron horseshoe-shaped insert, called a heel iron, to strengthen the heel, and an iron toe-piece. They may also have steel toecaps. The hobnails project below the sole and provide traction on soft or rocky terrain and snow, but they tend to slide on smooth, hard surfaces.

They have been used since antiquity for inexpensive durable footwear, often by workmen and the military.  Examples include the caligae of the Roman military, the "ammo boot" in use by the British and Commonwealth armies from the 1860's and the US Army "trench boots" of World War I.

Important design work for the modern hobnailed boot was done during World War I, e.g. the "Pershing boot" in the United States.
Problems experienced in designing WWI US Army boots were:
Tearing at the backstay: solved by securing the backstay with three rows of stitching each side.
Letting water in: solved by dubbin.
Rotting in foul conditions in trenches: solved by chrome tanning rather than using vegetable tanning.
Cold conducting through hobnails into the feet: that, and need for strength, solved by three thicknesses of leather in the soles.
Sole wear: toe and heel irons in addition to hobnails.

Hobnailed boots were formerly used for mountaineering to grip on sloping rock surfaces. Mountaineering hobnailed boots tended to have large pointed hobnails on the extreme edges of the soles and heels to grip small roughness on steeply sloping rock and on snow, particularly before crampons were used.

See also
 Caulk boots (spike-soled boots worn by loggers and tree planters in many places)
 Ammunition boot, the hobnail-studded boots used by the British Army from 1880 to 1958.

References

External links
Chambers, William (1904). "Hobnail". Chambers's Etymological Dictionary of the English Language, W. & R. Chambers, p. 231. Archived at Google Books.
Chambers, William (1904). "Stud". Chambers's Etymological Dictionary of the English Language, W. & R. Chambers, p. 497. Archived at Google Books. 

Footwear components
Shoemaking